Alain Zimmermann (born 1967) is the Chief Executive Officer of Swiss luxury watch manufacturer Baume & Mercier (belonging to the Richemont Group). His experience in the luxury industry spans over 20 years, having previously held positions in L’Oréal, Cartier and IWC.

Early life
Alain Zimmermann was born in Alsace, France in 1967. He attended school in the French town of Reims where he obtained a DESEM in Marketing at the Reims Management School in 1987. He went on to study at Reutlingen University in Germany, graduating in 1989 with a degree in Business Administration specializing in Marketing & Logistics.

Career

Zimmermann first began his career at L’Oréal Germany in 1989. Having initially signed with the company for a 16-month V.S.N.C (Voluntary National Service Company), he went on the stay with L’Oréal until 1995. At L’Oréal he encountered the world of luxury products, marketing their leading perfumes including Paloma Picasso, Armani and Ralph Lauren.

In 1995, Alain Zimmermann joined the jewelry and watch brand Cartier in Germany. Four years later he transferred from Munich to Paris, where he was appointed to International Development Director of the Cartier perfume range.

Zimmermann joined IWC, the luxury watchmakers from Schaffhausen, in 2002. In what was his first foray into haute horology, Zimmerman quickly learned about fine watchmaking through top experts. Zimmermann remained at IWC for almost five years and held a series of international sales and marketing roles.

In 2006, Zimmermann moved to Julius Baer, the private bank based in Zurich. There, he held the position of Marketing & Communications Managing Director for a period of three years, before returning to IWC as the Chief Marketing Officer.

In 2009, Alain Zimmermann assumed his current position at the Swiss-based luxury watch manufacturer Baume et Mercier as CEO.

Personal
Zimmermann lives with his wife and two children in Switzerland, where he pursues his passion for skiing and photography among other interests.

References

External links

Interviews
"Baume & Mercier - La revitalisation intégrale" (Worldtempus, 14 February 2012)
"Interview: Richemont's Baume & Mercier Nears Break Even" (Dow Jones Newswires, 17 January 2012)
"Baume & Mercier - Recaptures Life’s Moments" (Worldtempus, 26 January 2011)

Video
"CEO of Baume & Mercier Alain Zimmermann Talks About 2012 Collection" (Watchmatchmaker.com, 26 January 2012)
"Watchmaker sets sights on the future" (CNN interview with Monita Rajpal, 17 January 2012)
"Baume & Mercier - New Brand Positioning with Alain Zimmermann" (Thewatches.tv, 2012)

Living people
1967 births
Swiss businesspeople
20th-century Swiss businesspeople
21st-century Swiss businesspeople
20th-century German businesspeople
21st-century German businesspeople